The qualification of the 2017 FIBA 3x3 Europe Cup took place in June 2017. Twenty-four teams from 16 countries took part in these tournaments, with 12 teams of each gender qualifying for the final championship.

Participating teams

Men

Women

Men's qualification

France Qualifier

Pool play 
Pool A

Pool B

Pool C

Pool D

Knockout stage

Final standings

Andorra Qualifier

Pool play 
Pool A

Pool B

Pool C

Pool D

Knockout stage

Final standings

Women's qualification

France Qualifier

Andorra Qualifier

Pool play

Knockout stage

Final standings

References

External links
Official website — Andorra Qualifier
Official website — France Qualifier

Q